Fred Håkan Ingvar Lindman (born 27 November 1961) is a Swedish former footballer who played as a forward. He represented the Sweden Olympic team at the 1988 Summer Olympics.

References

1961 births
Association football forwards
Swedish footballers
Sweden youth international footballers
Allsvenskan players
GAIS players
Malmö FF players
Living people
Olympic footballers of Sweden
Footballers at the 1988 Summer Olympics
Footballers from Gothenburg